Neohenricia is a genus of flowering plants in the family Aizoaceae, native to South Africa. Low-lying succulents, they are found in places that can collect a little water, such as crevices and pans, on sandstone or dolorite, in areas that get at least 200mm of rainfall annually.

The genus was named after Swiss-born South African plant physiologist Marguerite Gertrud Anna Henrici.

Species
Currently accepted species include:

Neohenricia sibbettii (L.Bolus) L.Bolus
Neohenricia spiculata S.A.Hammer

References

Aizoaceae
Aizoaceae genera
Taxa named by Louisa Bolus